Henry Emanuel Sugden (16 July 1859 – 4 September 1935) was an English cricketer who played for Derbyshire in 1882.

Sugden was born in Southgate, Middlesex and moved to Burton-on-Trent, Staffordshire where he was a brewer.

Sugden made his debut for Derbyshire in the 1882 season in June against a team of touring Australians. The team consisted of eleven past and future Australia Test cricketers, including Frederick Spofforth and Alec Bannerman. Australia won the match by an innings margin, while Sugden made little impression from the opening order, being bowled in the first innings and being out hit wicket off the bowling of Harry Boyle in the second. Sugden made just one further first-class appearance, against Lancashire two weeks later, scoring a duck in his first innings and dropping down the order in the second.

Sugden was a right-handed batsman and played four innings in two first-class matches, with a top score of 9 and an average of 3.25.

Sugden died in Chilworth, Hampshire at the age of 76.

References 

1859 births
1935 deaths
Derbyshire cricketers
English cricketers
People from Southgate, London